Mitochondrial ferritin is a ferroxidase enzyme that in humans is encoded by the FTMT gene.

It is classified as a metal-binding protein which is located within the mitochondria. After the protein is taken up by the mitochondria it can be processed into a mature protein and assemble functional ferritin shells.

Structure 

Its structure was determined at 1.70 Å through the use of X-ray diffraction and contains 182 residues. It is 67% helical. The Ramachandran plot shows that the structure of mitochondrial ferritin is mainly alpha helical with a low prevalence of beta sheets.

References

Further reading

EC 1.16.3
Storage proteins
Mitochondria